Susan Diane Reeve (née Scott; born 17 September 1951 in Birmingham, West Midlands) is a former female track and field athlete from England.

Athletics career
She competed in the women's long jump, pentathlon and heptathlon during her career. She represented Great Britain at three Summer Olympics: 1968, 1976 and 1980.

As Sue Scott she competed in the 1968 Olympics and in 1969 competed in the pentathlon at the 1969 European Athletics Championships in Athens. One year later she represented England in 100 metres hurdles and pentathlon events, at the 1970 British Commonwealth Games in Edinburgh, Scotland.

In 1971 she married and afterwards competed as Sue Reeve.

In 1978 she won a gold medal in the long jump, at the 1978 Commonwealth Games in Edmonton, Canada, either side of this success she appeared in two more Olympic Games, competing in the long jump.

References

1951 births
Living people
Sportspeople from Birmingham, West Midlands
British heptathletes
British female long jumpers
English female long jumpers
Olympic athletes of Great Britain
Athletes (track and field) at the 1968 Summer Olympics
Athletes (track and field) at the 1976 Summer Olympics
Athletes (track and field) at the 1980 Summer Olympics
Commonwealth Games gold medallists for England
Commonwealth Games medallists in athletics
Athletes (track and field) at the 1970 British Commonwealth Games
Athletes (track and field) at the 1978 Commonwealth Games
Medallists at the 1978 Commonwealth Games